The discography of Laura Pausini, an Italian pop singer, consists of thirteen studio albums, two compilation albums, respectively released for the Hispanic and Anglophone markets only, two international greatest hits album, three live albums and five video albums, including the live DVD Amiche per l'Abruzzo, released as part of the all-female Italian ensemble of the same name.

Pausini's first single, "La solitudine", was released by CGD Records in February 1993, and peaked at number one on the Italian Musica e dischi Singles Chart. 
The song was included in Pausini's eponymous debut album, released in Italy on 23 April 1993. The album peaked at number 6 on the Italian Albums Chart, and was later released in many other European countries, peaking at number three on the Dutch Albums Chart and selling three million copies worldwide.

Pausini's second album, Laura, was released in 1994 and sold more than four million copies worldwide. In November of the same year, a compilation including ten Spanish-language versions of songs originally featured on her previous albums was released in Spain and Latin America.
The album was certified diamond by the Association of Phonographic and Videographic of Spain, later renamed as PROMUSICAE, and became the best-selling album of 1994 in Spain.

Starting from 1996's Le cose che vivi—Las cosas que vives in Spanish—all of her studio albums have been released both in Italian and Spanish, except From the Inside, Pausini's English debut album, which was first released in the United States by Atlantic Records, in late 2002. From the Inside was later released in Europe and South America too, but it wasn't as successful as her previous albums, selling 800,000 copies worldwide.
Pausini's studio albums also include La mia risposta (1998, released as Mi respuesta in Spanish), Tra te e il mare (2000, released as Entre tú y mil mares in Spanish), Resta in ascolto (2005), which won a Grammy Award for its Spanish-language counterpart Escucha , the cover album Io canto (2006, Yo canto for the Hispanic market), Primavera in anticipo (2008, Primavera anticipada in Spanish), Inedito (released in 2011 with its Spanish version, Inédito), and Simili (2015, Similares in Spanish).

Her first worldwide released greatest hits album was released in 2001. Titled The Best of Laura Pausini: E ritorno da te in its Italian-language version and Lo mejor de Laura Pausini: Volveré junto a ti in its Spanish edition, the album became one of Pausini's biggest commercial successes, selling 700,000 copies in Italy and 800,000 copies in France. A second international compilation album, 20 - The Greatest Hits was released in 2013, celebrating the 20th anniversary of her debut. 
In 2016, Pausini also produced her first Christmas album, released both as Laura Xmas and as Laura Navidad.

During her career, Pausini recorded duets with several Italian and international artists, including Ray Charles, Michael Bublé, Juanes, Tiziano Ferro, Andrea Bocelli, Hélène Ségara, James Blunt, Kylie Minogue, Gloria Estefan, and Luciano Pavarotti.

Albums

Studio albums

Compilation albums

Live albums

Video albums

Featured video albums

Singles

1993–1999

2000–2004

2005–2009

2010–present

As featured artist

Notes
 Laura Pausini has never had any singles on the Finnish Top 20 Singles Chart, but she has charted on the Finnish Top 50 Hits (50 Hittiä) Chart that was published by the Finnish Magazine Rumba until December 2007. That chart combined singles sales with radio airplay (like Billboard Hot 100 and Dutch Top 40). Therefore, the chart positions listed here are for the Finnish Top 50 Hits Chart. The Chart positions from 2008 forward are from the Official Finnish Nielsen Music Control Airplay Chart.

Other appearances

Other charted songs

Music videos

Writing and production credits

Notes
A  As a compilation album, The Best of Laura Pausini: E ritorno da te was not eligible to chart on the French Albums Chart, but it peaked at number 2 on the French Compilations Chart.
B  "Le cose che vivi" did not chart on the Ultratop 50 in the Flanders, but it peaked at number 16 on the Ultratip chart.
C  "Tra te e il mare" did not chart on the Ultratop 50 in Wallonia, but it peaked at number 9 on the Ultratip chart.
D  "Resta in ascolto" did not chart on the Ultratop 50 in the Flanders, but it peaked at number 15 on the Ultratip chart.
E   "Vivimi" did not chart on the Ultratop 50 in Wallonia, but it peaked at number 15 on the Ultratip chart.
F  "Uguale a lei (She)" was only released as a digital single, and therefore was not allowed to chart on the Italian Singles Chart, which was based on physical sales only until 1 January 2008. However, the song charted at number 6 on the very first Italian Top Digital Downloads chart in April 2006.
G  "Io canto" did not chart on the Ultratop 50 in the Flanders, but it peaked at number 15 on the Ultratip chart.
H  "Spaccacuore" was only released as a digital single, and therefore was not allowed to chart on the Italian Singles Chart, which was based on physical sales only until 1 January 2008. However, the song peaked at number 13 on the Italian Top Digital Downloads chart in May 2007.
I  "Non me lo so spiegare" was only released as a digital single, and therefore was not allowed to chart on the Italian Singles Chart, which was based on physical sales only until 1 January 2008. However, the song peaked at number 13 on the Italian Top Digital Downloads chart in May 2007.
L  "Destinazione paradiso" was only released as a digital single, and therefore was not allowed to chart on the Italian Singles Chart until 1 January 2008, when it started to include digital sales. The song peaked at number 8 on the Italian Top Digital Download in November 2007; in January 2008, when the Top Digital Downloads replaced the physical sales chart as the Italian official singles chart, "Destinazione paradiso" debuted and peaked at number 14.
M  "Y mi banda toca el rock" was only released as a digital single, and therefore was not allowed to chart on the Italian Singles Chart until 1 January 2008, when it started to include digital sales. The song peaked at number 21 on the Italian Top Digital Download in November 2007.
N  "Primavera in anticipo (It Is My Song)" did not chart on the Ultratop 50 in the Flanders, but it peaked at number 9 on the Ultratip chart.
O  "Benvenuto" did not chart on the Ultratop 50 in Wallonia, but it peaked at number 8 on the Ultratip chart.
P  "Non ho mai smesso" did not chart on the Ultratop 50 in Wallonia, but it peaked at number 23 on the Ultratip chart.
Q  "Limpido" did not chart on the Ultratop 50 in Wallonia, but it peaked at number 18 on the Ultratip chart.
R  "Come il sole all'improvviso" was not released as a physical single, and therefore was not allowed to chart on the Italian Singles Chart, which was based on physical sales only until 1 January 2008. However, the song peaked at number 40 on the Italian Top Digital Downloads chart in November 2006.
S  "Il mio canto libero" was not released as a physical single, and therefore was not allowed to chart on the Italian Singles Chart, which was based on physical sales only until 1 January 2008. However, the song peaked at number 25 on the Italian Top Digital Downloads chart in November 2006.
T  "Strada facendo" was not released as a physical single, and therefore was not allowed to chart on the Italian Singles Chart, which was based on physical sales only until 1 January 2008. However, the song peaked at number 46 on the Italian Top Digital Downloads chart in November 2006.
U  "Te amaré" was not released as a physical single, and therefore was not allowed to chart on the Italian Singles Chart, which was based on physical sales only until 1 January 2008. However, the song peaked at number 39 on the Italian Top Digital Downloads chart in June 2007.

References
{{Reflist|30em|refs=

<ref name="ITA2">
Italian Singles Chart peak positions. Listed positions refer to Musica e dischi'''s single chart for releases until 1999, to the FIMI Singles Chart for singles released starting from 2000. Until the end of 2008, FIMI's chart was based on physical sales only. However, starting from 2006, a Digital Singles chart was compiled, and it replaced the physical singles chart as the Italian primary chart starting from 1 January 2008. Positions between 2000 and 2007, unless noted, refer to the physical singles chart. Positions from 2008 refer to the Digital Singles Chart:
 For "La solitudine": 
 For "Strani amori": 
 For "Un'emergenza d'amore": 
 For "One More Time": 
 For "Non sono lei": 
 For "Non ho mai smesso": 
 For "Le cose che non mi aspetto": "FIMI – Classifiche". Federazione Industria Musicale Italiana (in Italian). Retrieved 18 April 2015. Enter the section Archivio, then choose Top Digital in the field Sezione and 2012 in the field Anno. Finally, click on the chart for week 27. For "Celeste": "FIMI – Classifiche". Federazione Industria Musicale Italiana (in Italian). Retrieved 26 April 2015. Enter the section Archivio, then choose Top Digital in the field Sezione and 2012 in the field Anno. Finally, click on the chart for week 48. For "La solitudine" (2013 medley version): 
 For "In assenza di te": 
 For "Se non te": 
 For "Dove resto solo io": "FIMI – Classifiche". Federazione Industria Musicale Italiana (in Italian). Retrieved 18 April 2015. Enter the section Archivio, then choose Top Digital in the field Sezione and 2014 in the field Anno. Finally, click on the chart for week 7. For "Innamorata": 
 For "Inedito": 
 For all the other singles: </ref>

}}

External links
 Laura Pausini discography at Allmusic''.
 Laura Pausini Official Web Site

Discography
Discographies of Italian artists
Latin pop music discographies
Pop music discographies